William de Bohun, 1st Earl of Northampton, KG (c. 1312 – 16 September 1360) was an English nobleman and military commander.

Lineage
He was the fifth son of Humphrey de Bohun, 4th Earl of Hereford and Elizabeth of Rhuddlan. He had a twin brother, Edward. His maternal grandparents were Edward I of England and his first wife, Queen consort Eleanor of Castile.

Life
William de Bohun assisted at the arrest of Roger Mortimer in 1330, allowing Edward III to take power. After this, he was a trusted friend and commander of the king and he participated in the renewed wars with Scotland.

In 1332, he received many new properties: Hinton and Spaine in Berkshire; Great Haseley, Ascott, Deddington, Pyrton and Kirtlington in Oxfordshire; Wincomb in Buckinghamshire; Longbenington in Lincolnshire; Kneesol in Nottinghamshire; Newnsham in Gloucestershire, Wix in Essex, and Bosham in Sussex.

In 1335, he married Elizabeth de Badlesmere (1313 – 8 June 1356). Her parents Bartholomew de Badlesmere, 1st Baron Badlesmere, and Margaret de Clare had both turned against Edward II the decade before. Elizabeth and William were granted some of the property of Elizabeth's first husband, who had also been Mortimer's son and heir.

William was created Earl of Northampton in 1337, one of the six earls created by Edward III to renew the ranks of the higher nobility. Since de Bohun was a younger son, and did not have an income suitable to his rank, he was given an annuity until suitable estates could be found.

In 1349 he became a Knight of the Garter. He served as High Sheriff of Rutland from 1349 until his death in 1360.

Campaigns in Flanders, Brittany, Scotland, Sluys and Crecy
In 1339 he accompanied the King to Flanders.  He served variously in Brittany and in Scotland, and was present at the great English victories at Sluys and Crécy, the latter as a commander. His most stunning feat was leading an English force to victory against a much bigger French force at the Battle of Morlaix in 1342. Some of the details are in dispute, but it is clear that he made good use of pit traps, which stopped the French cavalry.

Diplomat
In addition to being a warrior, William was also a renowned diplomat.  He negotiated two treaties with France, one in 1343 and one in 1350. He was also charged with negotiating in Scotland for the freedom of King David Bruce, King of Scots, who was held prisoner by the English.

Senior naval command
From the 8 March 1352 to 5 March 1355 he was appointed Admiral of the Northern Seas, Fleet.

Issue
1. Humphrey de Bohun, 7th Earl of Hereford (1341–1373)
 
2. Elizabeth de Bohun (c. 1350–1385); married Richard FitzAlan, 4th Earl of Arundel

In historical fiction
In Bernard Cornwell's series The Grail Quest, the Earl of Northampton plays a minor role as protagonist Thomas of Hookton's lord. The Earl of Northampton also appears in Dan Jones' debut novel The Essex Dogs.

External links
Inquisition Post Mortem 

William de Bohun's IPM #168 and his wife Elizabeth de Bohun #169 follows Inquisition Post Mortem.

Ancestry

References

Bibliography
 
 

1312 births
1360 deaths
14th-century English Navy personnel
01
High Sheriffs of Rutland
Garter Knights appointed by Edward III
People of the Hundred Years' War
William
English admirals
Peers created by Edward III
Younger sons of earls